Sperata aorella is a species of bagrid catfish that occurs in the Ganges River in India and Bangladesh.

References 
 

Sperata
Freshwater fish of India
Fish described in 1858
Taxa named by Edward Blyth